This is a list of seasons played by Bayern Munich Frauen, FC Bayern Munich's women's section in German and European football, from the foundation of the first German championship, four years after the team was created, to the latest completed season.

Summary

 Rank = Final position
 P = Played
 W = Games won
 D = Games drawn
 L = Games lost
 F = Goals for
 A = Goals against
 GD = Goal difference
 Pts = Points

 Cup = DFB-Pokal (women)
 Europe = European competition entered
 R32 = Round of 32
 R16 = Round of 16
 QF = Quarter-finals
 SF = Semi-finals
 RU = Runners-Up
 W = Champions

Top scorers in bold were also the top scorers in the Frauen-Bundesliga that season.

 References: Top scorers — Championship / Bundesliga — Cup

References

women's seasons
Bayern Women
Bayern
FC Bayern